Glenea theodosia is a species of beetle in the family Cerambycidae. It was described by James Thomson in 1879. It is known from the Philippines and Malaysia.

Subspecies
 Glenea theodosia palavensis Aurivillius, 1903
 Glenea theodosia theodosia Thomson, 1879

References

theodosia
Beetles described in 1879